Major Hari Pal Singh Ahluwalia (6 November 1936 – 14 January 2022) was an Indian mountaineer, author, social worker and Indian Ordnance Factories Service (IOFS) officer. During his career he made contributions in the fields of adventure, sports, environment, disability and social work. He is one of six Indian men and the twenty first man in the world to climb Mount Everest. On 29 May 1965, 12 years to the day from the first ascent of Mount Everest, he made the summit with the fourth and final successful attempt of the 1965 Indian Everest Expedition along with H. C. S. Rawat and Phu Dorjee Sherpa. This was the first time three climbers stood on the summit together.

Following his advanced training at the Himalayan Mountaineering Institute, Darjeeling, he climbed extensively in Sikkim, Nepal. The 1965 Indian Army expedition was the first successful Indian Expedition to Everest which put 9 mountaineers on top, a record which lasted 17 years, and was led by Captain M S Kohli. He along with Avtar Singh Cheema, Nawang Gombu Sherpa, Sonam Gyatso, Sonam Wangyal, Chandra Prakash Vohra, Ang Kami Sherpa, Harish Chandra Singh Rawat and Phu Dorjee Sherpa summited the peak in 1965 and became the first Indians to successfully climb Mount Everest.  During the Indo-Pakistani War of 1965, he suffered a bullet injury to his spine which resulted in his confinement to a wheelchair. He was the Chairman of Indian Spinal Injuries Centre. He has written thirteen books and has also produced an award-winning serial, Beyond Himalaya, which has been telecast all over the world on Discovery and National Geographic channels.

Early life
Hari Pal Singh Ahluwalia was born on 6 November 1936 and brought up in Shimla along with his two sisters and two younger brothers. His father was employed as a Civil Engineer in the Indian Central Public Works Department.

For his academic career he went to St Joseph's Academy, Dehradun and St. George's College, Mussoorie. There, he discovered his interest in photography and rock climbing. Along with graduation, his interest in rock-climbing increased. Some of the places where Ahluwalia did his rock climbing are Garhwal, Sikkim, Nepal, Ladakh, and of course Mount Everest. He graduated with a bachelor's degree in Electrical and Mechanical engineering from the College of Military Engineering, Pune in 1964.

Military career

After his graduation Ahluwalia joined the Indian Army as an officer, receiving a commission as a second lieutenant in the Army Electrical-Mechanical Engineering branch on 14 December 1958. He was promoted to lieutenant on 14 December 1960 and to captain on 14 December 1964. Seeing action during the 1965 war with Pakistan, he was wounded by a bullet in his spine, which left him confined to a wheelchair. He received an early discharge from the Army on 8 January 1968, with the honorary rank of major.

Expeditions and adventures
After treatment at Stoke Mandeville Hospital in England, he continued to pursue his love of adventure by organising pioneering events such as the first Ski Expedition to Mount Trisul, the first Trans-Himalaya Motor Expedition (1983), and the Central Asia Cultural Expedition (1994) following the Silk & Marco Polo's Route through Uzbekistan, Kyrgyzstan, Kazakhstan, entering China in the Asian City of Kashgar, Yarkhand and returned via Tibet and Kathmandu.

Ahluwalia has also been the President of the Indian Mountaineering Foundation and Delhi Mountaineering Association. He was also the Chairman of Special Ability Trust (created to assist young achievers with disabilities with fellowships and scholarships), Youth Exploring Society (with its chapters in Ireland, West Germany and Italy), Rehabilitation Council of India (a statutory body under the Ministry of Social Justice & Empowerment), Chairman of Planning Committee of Persons with Disability of 12-year plan and Chairman of the Committee of Drafting Country Report.

Professional career

Realizing the needs of persons with spinal injuries, Ahluwalia, with the support of his friends, set up the Indian Spinal Injuries Centre (ISIC) in Vasant Kunj, New Delhi, India in 1993. He also served as an IOFS officer. His experiences have appeared in school books such as in the NCERT Class 8 English textbook. He met many great achievers such as  Indira Gandhi, APJ Abdul Kalam et cetera.

Positions
Chairman – Indian Spinal Injuries Centre.
Chairman – Planning Committee of Persons with Disability of 12 year plan and Chairman of the committee of drafting country report.
Former president – Indian Mountaineering Foundation.
Former president – Delhi Mountaineering Association.
Former chairman – Special Ability Trust (created to assist young achievers with disabilities with *fellowships and scholarships).
Former chairman – Youth Exploring Society (with its chapters in Ireland, West Germany and Italy).
Former chairman – Rehabilitation Council of India (a statutory body under the Ministry of Social Justice & Empowerment).
Member – Indira Gandhi Memorial Trust.
Member – Planning Commission – Steering committee of the Social Welfare and other special groups.
Member – National Consultation on National Policy for PwD.
Member – CII Core Group on Disability.
Member – National Finance and Revenue Committee constituted by Ministry of Finance.
Member – CBR (Community Based Rehabilitation), in collaboration with AISPO-ITALY.
Member – International Spinal Cord Society

Personal life and death
Major Hari Pal Singh Ahluwalia died in Delhi on 14 January 2022, at the age of 85.

Bibliography
Higher than Everest

The Summit Within
Eternal Himalaya
Beyond the Himalayas
Everest- Where the Snow never melts
Hermit Kingdom Ladakh

Ladakh Nubra The Forbidden Valley
 Tracing Marco Polo's Journey

Awards

Medal bar

National Awards
Arjuna Award-1965

Padma Shri-1965
Padma Bhushan-2002

Tenzing Norgay National Adventure Award for lifetime achievement-29 August 2009

National Award for the Welfare of People with Disabilities-3 December 1998

Order of the Khalsa (Nishan-e- Khalsa) Tercentenary of the Birth of Khalsa

International Awards
FRGS – Fellow of the Royal Geographical Society (United Kingdom)
Fellowship conferred for significant contribution to studies and literature written on Environment and Adventure
CONDOR-DE-ORO – A high Argentinian honour given for overall contribution to adventure writing / participation in Adventure Sports.
Advisor/Consultant to the Argentina Everest Expedition
World Health Initiative for Peace Award, 29 July 2013

Gallery

See also
Indian summiters of Mount Everest - Year wise
List of Mount Everest summiters by number of times to the summit
List of Mount Everest records of India
List of Mount Everest records

References

1936 births
2022 deaths
Indian Ordnance Factories Service officers
Indian summiters of Mount Everest
Indian mountain climbers
Recipients of the Padma Shri in sports
Recipients of the Arjuna Award
Recipients of the Padma Bhushan in social work
Indian Army officers
Mountain climbers from Punjab, India
Social workers from Punjab, India
Indian Sikhs
People from Sialkot
20th-century Indian educators
Recipients of the Tenzing Norgay National Adventure Award
Ahluwalia